Uncharacterized protein KIAA1267 is a protein that in humans is encoded by the KIAA1267 gene.

Interactions 

KIAA1267 has been shown to interact with CCDC85B.

References

Further reading 

 
 
 
 
 
 
 
 

Uncharacterized proteins